Aliaj is a settlement in the former Kastrat Municipality, Shkodër County, northern Albania. At the 2015 local government reform it became part of the municipality Malësi e Madhe. It has a population of 1,033.

References

Kastrat (municipality)
Populated places in Malësi e Madhe
Villages in Shkodër County